Sobat may refer to:

Sobat, Afghanistan
Sobat River, in South Sudan
, a British coaster
Synchronized On-Board Audio Track (SOBAT), an audio playback technology used in Walt Disney Parks and Resorts rides
Gail Sidonie Sobat, Canadian writer, educator, singer and performer
Sobat (food), a dish made in Dera Ismail Khan District, Pakistan
2009 Sobat River ambush, Jikany Nuer tribesmen vs. the Sudanese People's Liberation Army (SPLA), escorting a United Nations (UN) aid convoy
Sobat flappet lark (Mirafra rufocinnamomea), a species of lark which is widespread in Africa

See also
 Sobatu (also S̄obātū or Şoḩbatū), a small, rural village in Fars Province, Iran
 Soba (disambiguation)